Władysław Mikos (19 November 1885 —3 November 1970) was a Polish painter.

Mikos was born in Brzóza, Poland under Russian occupation. He was a graduate of Jan Matejko Academy of Fine Arts and student of Jacek Malczewski, Teodor Axentowicz and Leon Wyczółkowski. He is famous as a dedicated South Mazovia region painter and achieved many awards for his works and became famous in Poland in the mid-wars period. He died in Radom, Poland, where one of its streets now bears his name.

References

1885 births
1970 deaths
Polish painters
Polish male painters
Jan Matejko Academy of Fine Arts alumni